The 1948 Arkansas gubernatorial election was held on November 2, 1948.

Incumbent Democratic Governor Benjamin Travis Laney did not seek a third term.

Democratic nominee Sid McMath defeated Republican nominee Charles R. Black with 89.37% of the vote.

Democratic primary

The Democratic primary election was held on July 27, 1948, with the runoff held on August 10, 1948.

Candidates
C. A. Fleming
Jack Wilson Holt Sr., former Arkansas Attorney General
William Jennings
Bob Ed Loftin (withdrew in favour of McMath)
John Lonsdale, Jr., former mayor of Lonsdale
James "Uncle Mac" MacKrell, radio presenter
Sid McMath, prosecuting attorney for the Eighth Judicial District
Jim Merritt, attorney (withdrew in favour of Holt)
Horace Thompson, former Internal Revenue collector

Results

General election

Candidates
Sid McMath, Democratic
Charles R. Black, Republican, lumber manufacturer

Results

References

Notes

Bibliography
 
 

1948
Arkansas
Gubernatorial
Arkansas gubernatorial election